Club Social de Deportes Rangers is a Chilean football club based in the city of Talca. The club was founded November 2, 1902 and plays in the second level of the Chilean football system. Their home games are played at the Fiscal stadium, which has a capacity of 16,000 seats.

History

The name Rangers was chosen by a Scotsman, Juan Greenstret, who was one of the founding fathers of the Club on behalf of Mrs. Amalia Neale de Silva, the first benefactress of the club.

The origin of the chosen team colours, red and black, are unknown, though one of the possibilities was that some of the first players were also members of the Second Company of Firemen of Talca, whose shield was red and black. Another possible reason is the use of red and black in the socks of Rangers of Scotland (formed 1872) to represent the district colours of their local burgh of Govan.  Fans of the Scottish club returned to using red and black scarves in 2012 to help raise funds for the club.

In 1952 was accepted into the Segunda División, and won the runners-up spot after finishing second in the league tournament final, getting the promotion to Primera División.

Rangers qualified for the Copa Libertadores in 1970, being its only participation in a CONMEBOL international tournament.

Throughout their first century of existence, honours have been few and far between, with no Championship successes.

Rangers was relegated in 2009 after being assessed a three-point penalty for using too many non-Chilean players in a November 8 match. The club filed a lawsuit in a Chilean court, leading to a threat from FIFA to throw out the Chile national team of the 2010 World Cup if the case continued. Under pressure from creditors, Rangers dropped the lawsuit on November 27, shortly after FIFA's demand. The case delayed the start of the league's playoffs.

In 2010, the club was auctioned and purchased by a business group called "Piduco SADP".

On November 27, 2011, Rangers was promoted to Primera División after beating Everton de Viña del Mar in the final match. Manager Dalcio Giovagnoli was fired in 2013, and replaced by Fernando Gamboa, who was considered mainly responsible of the team's relegation in 2014. Gamboa was fired too, but current manager Jorge Garcés wasn't able to avoid the side's relegation after two and a half years in the first division of Chilean football to the second division, the Primera B after finishing in the last place of both the Clausura and the accumulated table. The club's new owners confirmed Garcés will remain as the club's manager for the 2014–15 season, with the goal of gaining promotion to the first division.
In October 2014, in a ceremony at the Talca Country Club, the marquess Luis Silva de Balboa transferred the trademark Rangers to the club. The trademark was his property until such time, and by a legal agreement, the transfer contains restrictions as to the limitation for the club to move out of the City of Talca of its ownership in hands other than people from Talca.

National honors
Primera B: 3
1988, 1993, Apertura 1997

Primera División: 0
Runner-up: 1969, Apertura 2002

South American cups history

Players

Current squad

2021 Winter transfers

In

Out

Notable players

  Germán Portanova

Managers

  Nemesio Lora (1952)
  Oscar Andrade (1952)
  Charles Bown (1953)
  Ladislao Pakozdi (1953–55)
  José Luis Boffi (1956–57)
  Renato Panay (1957)
  José Klamar (1958)
  Guillermo Baeza (195?)
  Sergio Sagredo (1959)
  Renato Panay (1960)
  Omar Cabral (1960–61)
  José Dunevicher (1961)
  Donato Hernández (1962)
  Adolfo Rodríguez (1963–66)
  Ladislao Pakozdy (1967)
  Hernán Rodríguez (1967)
  José Santos Arias (1968)
  Oscar Andrade (1968–71)
  Sergio Cruzat (1971)
  Hernán Gárate (1972)
  Jorge Reyes (1972)
   Miguel Montuori (1972)
  Pedro Areso (1972–74)
  Constantino Mohor (1975)
  Adolfo Rodríguez (1975–76)
  Eladio Benítez (1976)
  Eugenio Jara (1976)
  Jorge Venegas (1977)
  Ramón Climent (1978)
  Carlos Collado (1978)
  Carlos Contreras (1978)
  Arturo Rodenak (1978–79)
  Antonio Vargas (1980)
  Sacha Mitzjaew (1980)
  Sergio Gutiérrez (1980)
  Alfonso Sepúlveda (1981)
  Germán Cornejo (1981)
  Gastón Guevara (1982)
  Arturo Rodenak (1982)
  Orlando Aravena (1983)
  Gustavo Cortés (1984)
  Eugenio Jara (1984)
  Antonio Vargas (1985)
  Arturo Rodenak (1985–86)
  Armando Tobar (1986)
  José Lagos (1987)
  Germán Cornejo (1987)
  Hugo Solís (1988–89)
  Miguel Ángel Leyes (1989)
  José Lagos (1989)
  Jorge Luis Siviero (1990)
  Patricio Gutiérrez (1990)
  Arturo Rodenak (1990–91)
  Eduardo Prieto (1991)
  Sergio Gutiérrez (1991)
  Eugenio Jara (1991–92)
  Francisco Valdés (1992)
  Hugo Solís (1993–94)
  Antonio Vargas (1994)
  Patricio Gutiérrez (1994)
  Guillermo Páez (1995)
  Raúl Toro (1996–99)
  Eduardo Fournier (1999)
  José Sulantay (1999)
  Miguel Ángel Castelnoble (2000)
  Juan Ubilla (2000–01)
  Oscar del Solar (2002–03)
  Daniel Salvador (2004)
  Gerardo Reinoso (2004)
  Yuri Fernández (2005)
  Ramón Castro (2006)
  Gerardo Reinoso (2006)
  Juan Carlos Hernández (2007)
  Oscar del Solar (Dec 1, 2007 – Dec 31, 2008)
  Juan Carlos Hernández (2008)
  Juan Ubilla (2009)
  Oscar del Solar (March 1, 2009 – Dec 31, 2009)
  Rubén Vallejos (2010)
  Fernando Cavalleri (2010)
  Roberto Mariani (Jan 1, 2011 – June 1, 2011)
  Marcelo Peña (2011 – Sept 26, 2011)
  Gabriel Perrone (Sept 25, 2011 – March 26, 2012)
  Dalcio Giovagnoli (March 26, 2012 – Sept 28, 2013)
  Fernando Gamboa (Sept 29, 2013 – March 22, 2014)
  Jorge Garcés (March 23, 2014– 2014)
  Carlos Rojas (2014–2015)
  Héctor Almandoz (2015–2016)
  Víctor Rivero (2016-)

Official sponsors
Lotto
Productos Fernández

References

External links
Rangers Talca Website

 
Football clubs in Chile
Association football clubs established in 1902
Sport in Maule Region
1902 establishments in Chile